The Rivière de l'Est is a river on the Indian Ocean island of Réunion. It flows northeast from the southeast of the island, reaching the sea between the towns of Sainte-Anne and Sainte-Rose.

References

Rivers of Réunion
Rivers of France